Odisseia or Canal Odisseia is a Portuguese basic cable and satellite television channel that features documentaries. It is the oldest and one of the most notable of the genre in Portugal and, for most of its history, it was a single Iberian channel for Portugal and Spain with feeds in Portuguese to Portugal in a list of notable channels owned by Multicanal (currently AMC Networks International Iberia), including some of the oldest and most popular cable channels such as Canal Hollywood and Canal Panda. It split into two sister channels, and the Portuguese version became available in Portuguese-speaking Africa where it also gained notability.

Canal Odisseia, literally translating as Odyssey Channel, features various documentaries by the BBC, Granada Television, European, American and local productions, dedicated to nature, science, people and arts. It competes with other widely available cable channels, the Discovery Channel and National Geographic Channel.

Portuguese-language television stations
Television channels and stations established in 1996
Television stations in Portugal